UAAP Season 80 is the 2017–18 athletic year of the University Athletic Association of the Philippines (UAAP). This season was hosted by the Far Eastern University.

The eight member universities of the UAAP competed in the league's 28 events from 15 sports to vie for the overall championship. This season's sports events included the inaugural 3-on-3 basketball as a demonstration sport held at FEU Manila.

Reorganization 
On January 12, 2017, the presidents of the member institutions of the University Athletics Association of the Philippines (UAAP) met in the campus of the host university, the University of Santo Tomas, to discuss the re-organization of the association.

In an interview with the UST Rector, the Very Rev. Fr. Herminio V. Dagohoy, O.P., PhD, he said that the group "approved in principle the re-organization of the UAAP." Such entails that the Presidents/Rectors will become the members of the Board of Trustees, while the present members of the Board of Trustees will comprise the Board of Managing Directors, which will manage and supervise the UAAP events, like games, among other things.

To be created under the proposed change are "risk and audit committees, which will be under the Board of Trustees." Meanwhile, other working committees similar to existing committees will be created and placed under the supervision of the board of managing directors.

The proposed amendments to the Articles of Incorporation and By-Laws will be submitted to the Securities and Exchange Commission for approval, and are eyed for implementation in time for the opening of the 80th season of UAAP later in 2017.

In August 2017, the UAAP Chairman of the Board of Trustees, Dr. Michael Alba of the Far Eastern University, announced the appointment of Atty. Rene Andrei Q. Saguisag, Jr., as the Association's first Executive Director.

Opening ceremony 
The opening ceremony of the UAAP Season 80 was held on September 9, 2017 at the Mall of Asia Arena in Pasay City.  With the season's theme, "Go for Great", the ceremony gave tribute to its long list of athletic legends. 

Started with various performances from students and a live band, the ceremony's highlight was the parade of athletes joined by "UAAP greats" from each school. Among the greats who represented their respective schools were Ateneo’s Alyssa Valdez and Rico Villanueva; NU’s Danny Ildefonso, Ray Parks and Christine Patrimonio; UP’s Ronnie Magsanoc, Joe Lipa, and former varsity volleyball player Congreswoman Pia Cayetano; FEU’s Glenn Capacio, Terrence Romeo and Rachel Anne Daquis; UST’s Aric del Rosario, Dylan Ababou and Cyrus Baguio; UE’s Tisha Abundo; Adamson’s Queeny Sabobo, and Ana Santiago; and DLSU’s Renren Ritualo and Marielle Benitez.

Sports calendar
This is the calendar of events of the UAAP Season 80. The list includes the tournament host schools and the venues.

First semester

Second semester

Basketball

Seniors division
The UAAP Season 80 seniors division basketball tournament began on September 9, 2017 at the Mall of Asia Arena. The tournament host is Far Eastern University and the tournament commissioner is Atty. Rebo Saguisag. The UAAP have adopted FIBA rules on technicals, timeouts, among others. The tournament still used referees from BRASCU for officiating.

Men's tournament 
The primary venues are the Mall of Asia Arena and the Smart Araneta Coliseum. The Filoil Flying V Centre serves as the alternate venue (on the games on October 15 and 22) when the MOA Arena and Araneta Coliseum are unavailable.

Elimination round

Team standings

Playoffs

Awards
 Most Valuable Player: 
Rookie of the Year:

Women's tournament

Elimination round

Team standings

Playoffs

Awards
 Most Valuable Player: 
Rookie of the Year:

Juniors division

Elimination round

Team standings

Playoffs

Awards
 Most Valuable Player:

3×3 basketball
The UAAP expanded its number of tournaments by holding 3×3 basketball games in the men's and women's divisions as a demonstration sport in Season 80. The inclusion of 3×3 basketball in the list of UAAP tournaments is timely as 3×3 basketball is now an Olympic event. 3×3 basketball may be reclassified as a regular sport next season after the positive responses from member schools who all fielded a team.

Men's tournament

Group A

Group B

Playoffs

Women's tournament

Group A

Group B

Playoffs

Medalists

Volleyball

Seniors' division
The UAAP Season 81 seniors division volleyball tournaments will begin on February 16, 2019. The tournament main venue is the Filoil Flying V Centre in San Juan City while selected games will be played at the SM Mall of Asia Arena in Pasay and Smart Araneta Coliseum in Cubao, Quezon City. The tournament host is the National University.

Men's tournament

Elimination round

Playoffs

Awards
Most Valuable Player: 
Rookie of the Year:

Women's tournament

Elimination round

Playoffs

Awards
Most Valuable Player: 
 Rookie of the Year:

Juniors' division
The UAAP Season 80 Juniors volleyball tournament started on September 9, 2017. National University athletic director Chito Loyzaga and Sports Vision chairman Moying Martelino announced a partnership that resulted in the UAAP Season 80 boys and girls volleyball games being played at FilOil Flying V Centre in San Juan using the facilities of the Premier Volleyball League (PVL). The San Juan venue will be the new home of the UAAP high school volleyball. The Adamson gym hosted the competition for three years since 2014. The UAAP wanted a good venue to develop young high school volleyball players. The FilOil Flying V Centre will give young and promising high school volleyball players a venue where they can perform at their very best. For the first time these high school players will get a chance to compete on a taraflex floor.

The girls volleyball matches will be played from 12 noon to 4:00 p.m. every Monday and Saturday. The boys matches will be held every Wednesday on the same timeslots. On Sundays there will be four boys matches starting at 10:00 a.m. and a lone girls game at 8:00 a.m.

National University is the tournament host. The number of participating schools in the boys' and girls' tournaments increased to eight and seven, respectively. Far Eastern University fielded boys' and girls' volleyball teams beginning season 77. Adamson fielded a boys' team starting season 79. Since there are now more than six participating schools in each tournament, both tournaments will have a Final Four format. The UAAP Board decided to move the high school volleyball tournaments from 2nd semester to 1st semester in Season 78 due to the basketball juniors tournament being moved from the 1st semester to 2nd semester.

Boys' tournament

Elimination round

Playoffs

Awards 
 Most Valuable Player: 
 Rookie of the Year:

Girls' tournament

Elimination round

Playoffs

Awards 
 Most Valuable Player: 
 Rookie of the Year:

Football

The UAAP Season 80 football tournaments started on November 18, 2017 for the juniors division; and on February 3, 2018 for the women's division and the following day for the men's division.

The tournament venue will be at the Rizal Memorial Stadium. The tournament host is De La Salle University.

Seniors division

Men's tournament

Elimination round

Team standings

Match-up results

Scores

Results to the right and top of the gray cells are first round games,those to the left and below are second round games.

Playoffs

Awards
 Most Valuable Player: 
 Rookie of the Year:

Women's tournament

Elimination round

Team standings

Match-up results

Scores

Results to the right and top of the gray cells are first round games,those to the left and below are second round games.

Finals

Awards
 Most Valuable Player: 
 Rookie of the Year:

Juniors division
The UAAP Season 80 juniors division football tournament started on November 19, 2017.  Rizal Memorial Football Stadium and De La Salle Canlubang Football Field are the playing venues. Ateneo is the tournament host. The number of participating schools increased to five from the four teams of season 79. NU fielded a team starting season 80.

Boys' Tournament

Elimination round

Team standings

Match-up results

Scores

Results to the right and top of the gray cells are first round games,those to the left and below are second round games.

Playoffs

Finals

Awards
 Most Valuable Player: 
 Rookie of the Year:
 Best Striker: 
 Best Midfielder: 
 Best Defender: 
 Best Goalkeeper: 
 Fair Play Award:

Baseball
The UAAP Season 80 men's division baseball tournament will begin on February 4, 2018 at the Rizal Memorial Baseball Stadium in Malate Manila. The tournament host is Adamson.

Men's tournament

Elimination round

Team standings

Match-up results

Scores

Results to the right and top of the gray cells are first round games, those to the left and below are second round games. Superscript is the number of innings played before the mercy rule applied.

Finals

Awards
 Season Most Valuable Player: 
 Finals Most Valuable Player:  
 Rookie of the Year: 
 Best Pitcher: 
 Best Hitter: 
 Best Slugger: 
 Most Runs Batted-In: 
 Most Home-runs: 
 Most Stolen Bases:

Boys' tournament
The UAAP Season 80 Boys' division baseball tournament began on January 20, 2018 at the Rizal Memorial Baseball Stadium in Malate Manila. NU fielded a boys' baseball team starting with Season 80. This brought the number of participating teams to four. Since there are now four teams participating, baseball will no longer be a demonstration sport in the Boys' Juniors division. It will be a regular sport with the participating schools earning points for the Juniors General Championship.  The tournament host is Adamson.

Elimination round

Team standings

Match-up results

Scores

Results to the right and top of the gray cells are first round games, those to the left and below are second round games. Superscript is the number of innings played before the mercy rule applied.

Finals

Awards
 Most Valuable Player: 
 Rookie of the Year:

Softball
The UAAP Season 80 softball tournament began on February 1, 2018 at the Rizal Memorial Baseball Stadium in Malate Manila. 
The tournament host is Adamson. Softball is a sport for women only in the UAAP.

Women's tournament

Elimination round

Team standings

Match-up results

Scores

Results to the right and top of the gray cells are first round games, those to the left and below are second round games. Superscript is the number of innings played before the mercy rule applied.

Playoffs

Awards
 Season Most Valuable Player: 
 Finals Most Valuable Player: 
 Rookie of the Year: 
 Best Pitcher: 
 Best Slugger: 
 Best Hitter: 
 Most Runs Batted-In: 
 Most Stolen Bases: 
 Most Home-runs:

Performance Sports

Cheerdance
The UAAP Season 80 cheerdance competition will be held on December 2, 2017 at the Mall of Asia Arena. This season will mark the comeback of University of the Philippines Pep Squad. Cheerdance competition is an exhibition event. Points for the overall championship are not awarded to the participating schools.

Team standings
 
Order refers to order of performance.

Special awards from sponsors:
 Yamaha Toss: NU Pep Squad
 Jollibee Inextrahan! Pyramid: Adamson Pep Squad

Group stunts competition
Ateneo did not compete in this competition.

Street dance
The UAAP Season 80 street dance competition was held on March 11, 2018 at the Mall of Asia Arena. This season marked the comeback of NU Underdawgz after a two-year absence. The juniors' division also competed for the first time. Street dance competition is an exhibition event. Points for the overall championship are not awarded to the participating schools.

Juniors division
The juniors presented first before the seniors. Ateneo did not participate.

Seniors division

Host team in boldface

General championship summary 
The general champion is determined by a point system. The system gives 15 points to the champion team of a UAAP event, 12 to the runner-up, and 10 to the third placer. The following points: 8, 6, 4, 2 and 1 are given to the rest of the participating teams according to their order of finish.

Medals table

Seniors' division

Juniors' division

General championship tally

Seniors' division

Juniors' division

Closing ceremony
The UAAP Season 80 closing ceremony was held at the FEU Auditorium, in the university's main campus in Morayta. The highlight of the 4:30 p.m. event is the announcement of the league's Athletes of the Year. All MVPs from 15 sporting events of the UAAP are eligible to win the Athlete of the Year award. The UAAP has also been giving out special citations to student-athletes who excel in their academics and some who represent the country in local and international competitions.

The closing ceremony also featured the turn-over of the flag of the UAAP to Season 81 host, National University. UAAP Season 80 President of the Board of Trustees Dr. Michael Alba, handed over the UAAP flag to NU's Teodoro Ocampo, the league's season 80 VP of the Board of Trustees, as a symbolic transition of responsibilities of the hosting of UAAP Season 81.

Athletes of the Year (Juniors) 
 Boy's Category
 Gio Pabualan (FEU / Football) 
 Girl's Category
 Nikki Pamintuan (La Salle / Swimming)
Athletes of the Year (Seniors) 
Men's Category:
 Kiko Gesmundo (La Salle / Baseball) 
 Women's Category
 Kirsten Chloe Daos (Ateneo / Swimming)
Athlete Scholars (Juniors)
 Philip Joaquin Santos (Ateneo)
 Jallen Agra (Adamson)
 Anna Fatima Royeca (La Salle)
 John Marvin Miciano (FEU)
 Faith Nisperos (NU)
 Samantha Cantantan (UE)
 Zoe Hilario (UPIS)
 Ronalyn Lalimo (NU)
Athlete Scholars (Seniors)
 Marquis Riley Alindogan (Ateneo)
 John Wilfred Enal (Adamson)
 Jamaica Sy (La Salle)
 Bernadeth Pons (FEU)
 Mike Minuluan (NU)
 William Billy Thomas Lara (UP)
 Noelito Jose (UST)

Broadcast coverage
For the 2nd straight season since its broadcast deal renewal, ABS-CBN Sports will provide television and online coverage for all UAAP events. The games will be aired live on S+A Channel 23, S+A HD Channel 166 and their website, sports.abs-cbn.com.

Commentators:
 Anton Roxas (Basketball, Volleyball, Football, Softball)
 Boom Gonzalez (Basketball, Volleyball)
 TJ Manotoc (Football, Baseball)
 Eric Tipan (Basketball, Volleyball)
 Jing Jamlang (Basketball, Volleyball, Football)
 Mico Halili (Basketball)
 Nikko Ramos (Basketball)
 Bob Guerrero (Football)

Analysts:
 Bea Daez (Basketball)
 Marco Benitez (Basketball)
 Christian Luanzon (Basketball)
 Ronnie Magsanoc (Basketball, Volleyball, Football, Baseball)
 Adrian Paolo "Doc Ian" Laurel (Volleyball)
 Andre Joseph "AJ" Pareja (Volleyball)
 Martin Antonio (Volleyball)
 Kirk Long (Volleyball)
 Maria Rosario "Charo" Soriano (Volleyball)
 Anne Remulla-Canda (Volleyball)
 Ivy Elayne Remulla (Volleyball)
 TJ Manotoc (Basketball, Football)
 Anton Edward del Rosario (Football)
 Darren Hartman (Football) 
 Marielle Benitez (Football)
 Natasha Alquiroz (Football)
 Mikee Carrion (Football)

See also
NCAA Season 93

References

 
80
UAA
UAA